Amata distorta is a moth of the subfamily Arctiinae. It was described by Rothschild in 1910. The type location is listed as J.Pulo Bisa bei Obi.

References

distorta